Richard Burton is a visiting lecturer at the University of Westminster and managing editor of the Jewish Chronicle. He has been editor of the websites of the British newspapers The Daily Telegraph and The Sunday Telegraph.

He was a Fleet Street journalist for 20 years, working for Today, the Sunday Mirror, and The Daily Telegraph.

External links
 The Jewish Chronicle
 telegraph.co.uk
 Richard Burton's blog
 Article complaining Wikipedia links to the wrong Richard Burton

Academics of the University of Westminster
Living people
Year of birth missing (living people)